Dante Milano (June 16, 1899 – April 15, 1991) was a Brazilian poet associated with modernism.

Life and works
He was born in Rio de Janeiro to Italian immigrants. He had his first poem published in 1920 when he was working as an accountant. He had successes in poetry after that and in 1935 organized an anthology of modernist poetry. In 1947 he married a woman named Alda. His poetry has been compared to Manuel Bandeira's. In 1988 he won the prestigious Prêmio Machado de Assis. Three years after that he died in Petrópolis.

20th-century Brazilian poets
Brazilian male poets
Modernist poets
Brazilian people of Italian descent
Writers from Rio de Janeiro (city)
1899 births
1991 deaths
20th-century Brazilian male writers